The Faith Healers is a 1987 book by magician and skeptic James Randi with a foreword by Carl Sagan, that documents Randi's exploration of the world of faith healing, and his exposing the sleight of hand trickery and deceit by its practitioners.

In eighteen chapters Randi explores the origins of faith healing and psychic surgery, and critically analyzes the claims made by A. A. Allen, Ernest Angley, Willard Fuller, WV Grant, Peter Popoff, Oral Roberts, Pat Robertson, and Ralph DiOrio for his claims of miracles at the Sanctuary of Our Lady of Lourdes in the town of Lourdes. Randi shows how people are tricked with magician's tricks under the guise of religion.

In 1988, Earl Hautala in a review wrote "an eye opener for the naïve, this book provides a crash course in the methods of skeptical inquiry." The New Scientist praised the book in a 1990 review.

See also
James Randi Educational Foundation

References

1987 non-fiction books
Faith healers
Books by James Randi
Prometheus Books books
Religious studies books
Scientific skepticism mass media
Supernatural healing